Johnny Dingle (born November 9, 1984) is a former American football defensive lineman. He played collegiately at West Virginia. He was undrafted in the 2008 NFL Draft.

Dingle was one of the league's most sought after undrafted rookie free agents, and was signed by the Kansas City Chiefs, but was waived after being signed to the practice squad.

High school career
Dingle was a four-year starter at defensive end at Booker T. Washington High School, where he recorded 89 tackles and 22 sacks as a senior. He also had a blocked punt and a game-saving field goal block as well. He also has his football number retired at the school. He was named All-State, named Dade County Player of the Year, and was the captain of the basketball team. He originally signed with Florida, but then changed his decision to West Virginia.

College career
Dingle enrolled at West Virginia University in 2004, but sat out the season due to grades. In 2005 as a sophomore, he recorded 13 tackles and 2.5 sacks on the season. As a junior in 2006, he started early at defensive end. Against Mississippi State, he had a two sacks for a total of 16 yards while he forced a fumble against Wofford. He missed the Syracuse and Connecticut with an ankle injury, but bounced back with two tackles against Louisville. In 2007, he was on the defensive line with Keilen Dykes. Dingle was named Second-team All-Big East and earned the team's Gridiron Gladiator Award at the conclusion of the regular season. In his final collegiate game, the 48–28 victory over Oklahoma in the 2008 Fiesta Bowl. He finished his senior season with 47 tackles, three sacks, two forced fumbles, and one fumble recovery. He, along with Pat White, and Marc Magro, was named an Honorable Mention All-American by Sports Illustrated.com.

Professional career

Pre-draft
On December 20, 2007, Dingle announced his intentions to leave West Virginia University to enter the NFL Draft. He still had a year of eligibility left, due to being a junior.

NFL Draft
Scott Wright, owner of NFL Draft Countdown, projected Dingle at #29 in the defensive end class. He was also invited to the NFL Scouting Combine. At the Combine, he was reported to have met with the Atlanta Falcons, Detroit Lions and Denver Broncos. In April 2008, USA Today ranked Dingle as the #12 defensive end and as a fourth round selection in the Draft. He was, however, not selected in the NFL Draft and thus became an undrafted free agent at the draft's conclusion.

Kansas City Chiefs
After going undrafted in the 2008 NFL Draft, Dingle was one of the league's most sought after undrafted players. He was signed by the Kansas City Chiefs. In the second week of the preseason, he recorded a tackle and a sack in his preseason debut against the Arizona Cardinals. However, after the preseason Dingle was waived from the Chiefs squad.

Abilene Ruff Riders
Johnny signed with the Abilene Ruff Riders of the Indoor Football League in December 2009.

References
 ESPN: Chat with former W. Virginia DE Johnny Dingle – SportsNation (2008)

References

External links
 Kansas City Chiefs bio
 West Virginia Mountaineers bio
 Kansas City Chiefs profile at ESPN.com
 Profile at CBSSports.com

1986 births
Living people
Booker T. Washington Senior High School (Miami, Florida) alumni
Players of American football from Miami
American football defensive ends
West Virginia Mountaineers football players
Cleveland Gladiators players
Jacksonville Sharks players
Abilene Ruff Riders players
Kansas City Chiefs players